Digos, officially the City of Digos, is a 2nd class component city and capital of the province of Davao del Sur, Philippines. According to the 2020 census, it has a population of 188,376 people.

The city lies on the western shores of Davao Gulf and southern foothills of Mount Apo on the island of Mindanao, centrally located between the three major cities in Mindanao, Davao City in the north, General Santos in the south and Cotabato City in the west.

It is considered as part of Metropolitan Davao.

It is known for its sweet-juicy 'carabao variety mango,' sold locally and exported abroad, thus being dubbed as the Mango Capital City of the Philippines. It is also considered as The Gate City Of The South.

On September 8, 2000, Digos was converted into a city.

History

In the early days, Digos was a watercourse, a meeting place of inhabitants belonging to the Austronesians who settled along the southern foothills of Mt. Apo. The Digos River meets Davao Gulf and it is ideal for fishing and bathing.

Digos was once part of the Sultanate of Maguindanao. During the 1800s, it was under the influence of Datu Bago, a Maguindanaon datu who led the resistance in Davao Region against the Spanish Empire.

During the Spanish Era, a group of natives carrying bows and arrows were approached by some Spaniards traversing the very fertile tracts of land in Davao. One Lopez Jaena Pacheco, a conquistador during the administration of Governor Claveria serving as the head of the group, inquired about the name of the place from the barefooted natives. Believing that the Spaniards were asking where they were bound to, the natives answered "Padigus", which means "to take a bath". Since then the place was identified as Digos.

As a portion of the "food bowl" of the province of Davao del Sur, otherwise known as the Padada Valley, Digos lured many migrants, majority of whom came from the Visayas and Ilocos regions to settle permanently in the area. Before World War II, an enterprising American by the name of N.E. Crumb leased 10.24 km2 and transformed the place into an Abaca Plantation. This became the hub of economic activity in the locality during those days.

Digos was occupied by the Japanese troops in 1942.

In 1945, through the brave efforts of the combined forces of the Philippine Commonwealth Army, the local Davaoeño guerrilla units from the Davao peninsula, and the United States military, the Japanese soldiers were defeated.

Through the initiation of then Congressman Apolinario Cabigon, Digos, became a regular municipality in 1949 by virtue of Presidential Executive Order No. 236, dated July 19, 1949, issued by President Quirino. Its Coverage included the barrios of Tres de Mayo, Goma Bansalan, Matanao, Darapuay and the Poblacion where the seat of government was located. Before its creation into a municipality, Digos was a barrio of Santa Cruz, a town 16 kilometers away. On July 19, 1949, the town was formally inaugurated with Benito Rabor appointed as Mayor.

Digos in later years, before its conversion into a city, was regarded as the capital town of the Province of Davao del Sur, long before it gained the status of a First Class Municipality in 1993, being center for trade, commerce and education, accruing to its strategic location at the cross point of two principal thoroughfares in the south.

Cityhood

In July 1998, the bid to convert into a city was moved and initiated by Mayor Arsenio A. Latasa, considering its very satisfactory qualifications required for in R.A. 7160

House Bill No. 5672 dated November 24, 1998, of Congress authored by Congressman Douglas Ra. Cagas, led to the drafting of Republic Act 8798, converting the Municipality of Digos into a component City of Davao del Sur, which was signed by President Joseph E. Estrada on July 14, 2000, and ratified by the Digoseños on September 8, 2000.

Geography
Digos shares common boundaries with the municipalities of Hagonoy in the south, Bansalan in the north and northwest by Siranagan and Miral Creek and with Santa Cruz in the northeast. It is bounded in the east by Davao Gulf. It has a total land area of  consisting of 26 barangays; nine (9) of which comprise the poblacion or urban center.

The land topography of Digos ranges from hilly to mountainous in the north-northeast portion and flat and slightly rolling at the coastal barangays, while the urban area and the surrounding barangays in the south portion are generally flat. Generally, climate in Digos falls under the fourth type while wind direction is prevalent from northeast to southwest. On the other hand, rainfall is evenly distributed throughout the year wherein during the period from 1995 to 2000, there was no observed extreme dry or wet season.

Climate

Barangays
Digos is politically subdivided into 26 barangays.

Demographics

Economy

Agriculture is a major component of Digos's economy. Some 9,330 households or 37% of the total households are dependent on agriculture for their livelihood. Of the total households dependent on agriculture, 91% are engaged in farming and the remaining 9% in fishing. The total area devoted to agriculture covered 8, 944.1 hectares, representing 31% of the total land area of Digos. The more important agricultural crops grown in the area include coconut, sugarcane, mango and banana. Among the agricultural crops, the staple crops rice and corn are the most widely grown.

Government

Elected officials
Members of the Digos City Council (2019-2022):
 Mayor: Josef Cagas
 Vice Mayor: Johari Baña

Culture

Fiestas and festivals
Sinulog sa Digos - every January 15
San Isidrio Labrador - every May 15
Padigosan Festival - every July 19
Mary Mediatrix - every August 22
Araw ng Digos - every September 8
GKK/BEC (Gagmay'ng Kristohanong Katilingban/Basic Ecclessial Community) Fiestas - Depends on the feast day of the patron saint.

Infrastructure

Transportation
Local means of transportation is served by almost 5,000 tricycles known locally as just "Pedicab". Transportation to its barangays and adjacent municipalities are served by single Motorcycles (SKYLAB/HABAL-HABAL), Multicabs, Jeepneys, and L300 Vans. Public Utility Vans also served routes to and from the cities of Davao, Cotabato, Kidapawan, Tacurong-Isulan, Koronadal and General Santos.

Bus Company operating in the city of Digos:
Mindanao Star (General Santos, Davao City & Cotabato City)
Davao Metro Shuttle (Tagum City)
Yellow Bus Lines Inc. (General Santos/Koronadal City)
Grand Transport Corp. (Tacurong City)
SEMTRAMPCO (Digos)
Tacurong Express (Tacurong City)
Davao ACF Bus Line (Malita, Davao del Sur)

Hospitals/healthcare facilities

Education

Public and private schools in Digos:

Tertiary 
Cor Jesu College (private, catholic)
University of Mindanao Digos Campus (private, non-sectarian)
Polytechnic College of Davao del Sur (private)
Davao del Sur State College (DSSC/SPAMAST) - Digos Campus (public)
John Paul II Seminary (theological school, Diocese of Digos)
PRIME Innovations, Technical and Vocational School [PITVS] (Private, Non-Sectarian)
Southern Mindanao Computer College (private)
Philippine International Technological School (private)
Adventure College Of Technology And Science (private)
Mindanao Technological Institute (private)
Digital Systems Institute (private)
Digos Institute Of Technical Education (private)

Secondary 

Cor Jesu College High School Department
Digos City National High School
Holy Cross Academy Inc.
The Lighthouse Accelerated Christian School
Polytechnic College of Davao del Sur High School Department
Digos City National High School Igpit Extension
Kapatagan National High School
Aplaya National High School
Ruparan National High School
Digos City National High School Soong Extension
Igpit National High School
 Digos City National High School - Balabag High School Annex
 Digos Central Adventist Academy - Lapu lapu Ext.
 Matti National High School

Notable personalities

 Scottie Thompson
 KZ Tandingan

References

External links

 Digos Profile at the DTI Cities and Municipalities Competitive Index
 [ Philippine Standard Geographic Code]
 Local Governance Performance Management System 

 
Cities in Davao del Sur
Provincial capitals of the Philippines
Populated places established in 1949
1949 establishments in the Philippines
Component cities in the Philippines
Establishments by Philippine executive order